Rodrigo Carvalho Gomes (born ) is a Brazilian journalist and writer. He was a reporter and currently is a foreign correspondent in London, England for Brazilian television channels GloboNews and Rede Globo.

Personal life and education 
Born in Niterói, Rio de Janeiro, Brazil, Carvalho is the son of Angela Maria Rebel de Carvalho, a professor at a university, and Carlos Carvalho. Carvalho is the cousin of Brazilian journalist Maria Beltrão, who also works at GloboNews, as a news anchor. He is married to Anne, who is a volunteer worker at a hospital in London.

Carvalho graduated in journalism by Pontifical Catholic University of Rio de Janeiro (PUC-Rio) in 2009 and has an MBA in international relations. He was an intern at Jornal da Cidade, a newspaper from Niterói, and at Projeto Comunicar, from PUC-Rio.

In 2016, when Carvalho and his wife moved to London, they took with them a mixed breed dog named Biriba, which was adopted by Carvalho in Angra dos Reis in 2015. Biriba called the public's attention by appearing multiple times alongside Carvalho in TV reports.

Career 
Carvalho started his career in journalism in 2009 as a reporter of cable news channel GloboNews, and since then, he has made multiple notable coverages, such as the natural disasters in Angra dos Reis, Brazil and the San Jose Mine accident in Chile in 2010; the French presidential elections in 2017, the Wedding of Prince Harry and Meghan Markle and the Tham Luang cave rescue in Thailand in 2018, and the canonization of Saint Dulce in 2019.

In 2014, Carvalho produced the documentary Tower of David, which described the day-to-day life of the residents of the biggest vertical slum in the world in Caracas, Venezuela. The documentary was nominated for the International Emmy Awards Current Affairs & News in the Current Affairs category.

Since 2016, Carvalho is a foreign correspondent in London for television channels GloboNews and Rede Globo.

Writer 
Carvalho wrote two nonfiction books, relating cases he followed when reporting in Chile and in Thailand. Both cases gained great international repercussion.

 (Portuguese for Alive Underground), released on 13 July 2012 by Globo Livros, tells the story of the rescue of 33 Chilean miners that got trapped for 69 days inside the San José Mine in 2010.

 (Portuguese for The Cave Boys), released on 21 November 2018 by the same publisher, reports on the rescue of twelve boys and their soccer trainer after they got trapped in the Tham Luang cave, in Thailand.

References 

1987 births
20th-century Brazilian male writers
Brazilian non-fiction writers
People from Niterói
Foreign correspondents
Television reporters and correspondents
Brazilian television journalists
Male journalists
Living people